George Boxley Cabin is a historic log cabin located at Sheridan, Hamilton County, Indiana.  It was built about 1828, and is a one-story, log structure measuring 18 feet, 6 inches, by 16 feet, 6 inches.  It has a gable roof and exterior end chimney.  It is typical of cabins built during this period. The building is owned by the Sheridan Historical Society and located in the Sheridan's Veterans Park.

It was listed on the National Register of Historic Places in 2005.

References

External links
Sheridan Historical Society: Boxley Cabin 

Historic house museums in Indiana
Log cabins in the United States
Houses on the National Register of Historic Places in Indiana
Houses completed in 1828
Buildings and structures in Hamilton County, Indiana
National Register of Historic Places in Hamilton County, Indiana
Log buildings and structures on the National Register of Historic Places in Indiana